Khlong Phanom is a national park in southern Thailand, protecting 256,500 rai ~  of forests within the Phuket mountain range. It was declared a national park on November 17, 2000.

The park is located in the southwest of Surat Thani Province, within the district Phanom. The park is continuous with the Khao Sok National Park to the north, separated by highway 401. To the southwest it is continued by the Tonpariwat Wildlife Sanctuary.

See also
List of national parks of Thailand
List of Protected Areas Regional Offices of Thailand

References

External links

National Park, Wildlife and Plant Conservation Department
Royal Gazette, Issue 95, Chapter 61 ก, Page 276, June 6 1978

National parks of Thailand
Geography of Surat Thani province
Protected areas established in 2000
Tenasserim Hills
Tourist attractions in Surat Thani province
2000 establishments in Thailand